Marine Night Fighter Squadron 534 (VMF(N)-534) was a United States Marine Corps night fighter squadron that was commissioned during World War II.  It was the fourth night fighter squadron commissioned in the service and participated in limited combat operations throughout 1944 and 1945 during Marine Corps operations over Kwajalein Atoll and the Mariana Islands. The squadron was decommissioned on May 31, 1947, as part of the post-war draw down of the service. Since then, no other Marine Corps squadron has carried the lineage and honors of VMF(N)-534.

History

Commissioning, training and, deployment 
VMF(N)-534 was commissioned on October 1, 1943, at Marine Corps Air Station Cherry Point, North Carolina on the authority of Marine Corps Dispatch 292038, dated September 23, 1943. The squadron received its first F6F-3N night fighter on December 1, 1943, and commenced training in eastern North Carolina until departing for the west coast on April 1, 1944.

Operations in the Central Pacific 

The squadron arrived at Naval Advance Base Espiritu Santo on May 4, 1944, and flew into Luganville Airfield the next day joining Marine Aircraft Group 21. After 65 days at sea, VMF(N)-534's, as part of Marine Aircraft Group 21, took off from the USS Santee, becoming the first aviation unit to land on Guam as they touched down on Orote Field on August 4, 1944. The first combat air patrols commenced on August 7, 1944. That same evening VMF(N)-534 also conducted its first night raids when a section of aircraft strafed the Japanese garrison on Rota. Between August 7 and December 29 the squadron conducted a total of eight strafing/bombing missions against Rota Island. While on Guam squadron personnel conducted numerous patrols and assisted in burying Japanese war dead. From August 4 through December 31, VMF(N)-534 flew 1402 sorties totaling 2,610.6 hours of flying conducting nighttime CAP, strafing and bombing, and search missions. Test flight, fighter cover and ferrying missions accounted for another 491.6 hours.

On February 20, 1945, the squadron recorded its only aerial victory of the war when 1stLt Brett Roueche, aided by GCI controllers from Air Warning Squadron 2 stationed aboard a Navy destroyer, shot down a Nakajima C6N 110 miles west of Saipan.  In May 1945 the squadron sent a detachment to Kobler Field on Saipan and another to Eniwetok to provide night time cover for each respective area. Tri-site operations continued until the end of the war. The squadron consolidated back on Guam by September 22, 1945.

Return to the United States and reorganization 
The squadron returned to the United States in November 1945 and joined up with the rest of Marine Aircraft Group 53 at Marine Corps Air Station Eagle Mountain Lake, Texas. On December 20, 1945, the squadron moved to Marine Corps Air Station El Centro, California joining Marine Aircraft Group 25. During the end of December VMF(N)-534 also began to receive its new F7F-3N night fighters.

Aircraft accidents
 August 7, 1944 - Capt Paul H. Todd, the squadron executive officer, went missing of the coast of Guam flying an F6F-5N.
 August 11, 1944 - 1st Lt Harley E. Croft was forced to bail out of his F6F-5N after its engine failed during a nighttime CAP.
 November 2, 1944 - 1stLt Percy L. Will's F6F-5N crashed at sea after having engine trouble while flying nighttime combat air patrol in the vicinity of Saipan.
 April 18, 1945 - Capt Charles F. Finnie died from injuries sustained when his F6F-5N crashed.

See also

United States Marine Corps Aviation
List of United States Marine Corps aircraft squadrons
List of decommissioned United States Marine Corps aircraft squadrons

Citations

References
Bibliography

N
Inactive units of the United States Marine Corps